Stockton is a former civil parish, now in the parish of Malpas, in the Cheshire West and Chester district and ceremonial county of Cheshire in England. In 2001 it had a population of 21. The civil parish was abolished in 2015 and merged into Malpas.

References

Former civil parishes in Cheshire
Malpas, Cheshire